India has competed in all except four editions of the Commonwealth Games; starting at the second Games in 1934. India has also hosted the games once, in 2010. The most successful event for India in these games is shooting.

History

Early years (1930s–1960s)

India have been fairly regular at the Commonwealth Games, featuring in all but four editions (1930, 1950, 1962 and 1986) of the quadrennial showpiece. Indian athletes debuted at the Commonwealth Games, then called the British Empire Games, back in 1934. The Indian contingent at London 1934 Games featured six athletes, who competed in 10 track and field events and one wrestling event. India won one medal at their debut Commonwealth Games. Wrestler Rashid Anwar was the first Indian to win a medal at the Commonwealth Games after clinching the bronze medal in the men's 74 kg freestyle wrestling event at 1934 British Empire Games. Since their debut in 1934, India have won 564 medals – 203 golds, 190 silvers and 171 bronze - at the Commonwealth Games. However, the first few editions were very challenging for the nation. Post-independence, India mainly participated in athletics but medals were few and far between until things took a turn for the better in 1958. Legendary sprinter Milkha Singh became the first Indian to win a gold medal at the Commonwealth Games, clinching the top spot in the men's 440 yard event at Cardiff 1958. India bagged another gold in the same edition when heavyweight wrestler Lila Ram won in the men's 100kg freestyle category. Cardiff 1958 was a historic year for women's participation too as track and field athletes Stephanie D’Souza and Elizabeth Davenport became the first Indian women to compete at the Commonwealth Games.

Rise (1970s–present)

Meanwhile, the rise of Indian wrestling in the 70s and the 80s played a significant role in the country's improving fortunes at the Commonwealth Games. After the wrestlers, the Indian weightlifters stepped up and earned numerous accolades for the nation, with Raghavan Chanderasekaran proving to be the jewel in the crown. Two-time Olympian weightlifter Raghavan Chanderasekaran won three gold medals, including snatch, clean and jerk and overall, in the flyweight division at Commonwealth Games 1990 and followed it up with three silvers in bantamweight at the 1994 edition in Victoria, Canada. Pistol shooter Jaspal Rana is the most successful Indian athlete at the Commonwealth Games, with 15 medals – nine golds, four silvers and two bronze. He dominated the shooting circuit in the 1990s and early 2000s. The Indian shooters played a crucial role during India's best showing at the Commonwealth Games, which came in 2010. At New Delhi 2010, India won 101 medals - 39 gold medals, 26 silvers and 36 bronze to finish second on the medals leaderboard. New Delhi 2010 remains India's most successful Commonwealth Games until date. Since the 2000s, India have consistently finished among the top five countries in the medals table and are now a force to be reckoned with at the Commonwealth Games.

Indian women step up the podium

While the men dominated the winners list in the initial years, Indian women have also upped their performances in the last few editions. Indian badminton players Ami Ghia and Kanwal Thakar Singh were the first Indian women to win a Commonwealth Games medal, pocketing a women's doubles bronze during Edmonton 1978. Indian women have come a long way since 1978. At Commonwealth Games 2018 in Gold Coast, Australia table tennis ace Manika Batra was the most successful Indian with four medals. India finished third with 66 medals at the edition.

Host Nation

India hosted the Games in 2010, at Delhi. It was India's most successful Commonwealth Games to date with Indian athletes winning 38 gold, 27 silver and 36 bronze medals.

Overall Medal Tally By Games

At the 2022 Commonwealth Games, India ended its campaign with a total of 61 medals (22 gold, 16 silver, 23 bronze). India with an overall total of 564 medals (203 gold, 190 silver, 171 bronze) is ranked 4th at the All-time Commonwealth Games medal table. India's first ever Commonwealth medal was won by Rashid Anwar, who won a bronze in the category of wrestling in 1934.

Overall Medal Tally By Sport

See also
India at the Olympics
India at the Paralympics
India at the World Games
India at the Asian Games
India at the Lusofonia Games
India at the South Asian Games

Notes

External links
 Delhi 2010 Official website
 Commonwealth Games News
 India & Commonwealth games 2010: Specific information

References

 
Nations at the Commonwealth Games